The 2012–13 Rugby-Bundesliga was the 42nd edition of this competition and the 93rd edition of the German rugby union championship. In the Rugby-Bundesliga, twenty-two teams played in, initially, four regional divisions, the first stage of the competition. The season started on 25 August 2012 and finished with the championship final on 15 June 2013, interrupted by a winter break from 25 November to 3 March. The regular season finished on Wednesday 1 May and the play-offs started on the following weekend, 4 May, and the German championship final was held on 15 June 2013.

The defending champions were Heidelberger RK who defeated TV Pforzheim in the 2012 final to take out its eights championship and third in a row. Heidelberger RK took out the national championship once more, remaining unbeaten all season and defeating local rival SC Neuenheim 41–10 in the final.

Overview

The league has been radically modified from the 2011–12 season. In 2011–12 the league operated with ten teams playing in a single division in a home-and-away format with semi-finals and a final at the end. In 2012–13 the league has been expanded, initially to twenty-four teams, which were to play in four regional divisions of six teams each. In those each team would play the others in its division just once. However, two teams resigned from the league before the start of the season, reducing the number of clubs to twenty-two. The Berlin Grizzlies of the eastern division opted to form a team with the reserve side of USV Potsdam Rugby and play in the 2nd Rugby-Bundesliga instead. DRC Hannover withdrew from the northern division just before the first game of the season, suffering from a lack of first team players and entered the tier three Rugby-Regionalliga instead for 2012–13.

The first stage of the competition, the Vorrunde, will finish on 3 October 2012 after which the second stage will start, the Qualifikationsphase, in which the top four teams each from the southern and the western group play each other in one group while the top teams from the north and east play each other in another. The finals series will be expanded from four to eight teams. The six teams not qualified for the Qualifikationsphase will enter the DRV-Pokal, the German rugby union cup, together with the top eight teams of the 2nd Bundesliga. The 2nd Bundesliga teams not qualified for the DRV-Pokal will play for the Liga Pokal.

In the second stage the teams within a group will play each other in a home-and-away format, with the teams that already played each other in the first stage carrying over those results. All sixteen clubs will qualify for the knock-out stage.

One of the main aims of the reform was to reduce the number of kilometres traveled by individual teams and therefore reduce the travel expenses. Additionally, the 2nd Bundesliga was also expanded to 24 teams.

Because of the enlargement of the league from ten to twenty-two (initially twenty-four) teams no club was relegated after the 2011–12 season but twelve clubs promoted:
Promoted from the 2nd Bundesliga South/West: Heidelberger TV, RC Luxembourg, ASV Köln Rugby, RC Mainz, RC Aachen
Promoted from the 2nd Bundesliga North/East: FC St. Pauli Rugby, SC Germania List, TSV Victoria Linden, Hamburger RC, Berliner SV 92, USV Potsdam Rugby (DRC Hannover withdrew before the first round due to a lack of players)
Promoted from the Rugby-Regionalliga: RC Leipzig (Berlin Grizzlies withdrew before the start of the season)

Two clubs finished the regular season unbeaten, DSV 78 Hannover and Heidelberger RK. Of the sixteen clubs qualified for the play-offs three decided to cancel their first round match, the three bottom placed clubs in the north east, Berliner SV 92, Victoria Linden and USV Potsdam, with all three games awarded 50-0 to the opposition. The quarter finals saw the south western clubs dominate with all four advancing teams being from that division and all north eastern clubs being knocked out. The semi finals were heavily affected by bad weather, with both games, to be held in Heidelberg, being canceled and rescheduled. The final saw Heidelberger RK defeat SC Neuenheim 41–10 to take out its ninth national championship and fourth consecutive one.

Bundesliga tables & results

First stage
In the first stage twenty-two clubs played in four groups. Within each group each team played the other just once. The best four teams in each group advanced to the second stage.

North
The table and results of the division:

 Relegated: None
 Promoted: 08 Ricklingen/Wunstorf

East
The table and results of the division:

 Relegated: None
 Promoted: Veltener RC

West
The table and results of the division:

 Relegated: RC Luxembourg (withdrawn)
 Promoted: TuS 95 Düsseldorf

 The game between RC Luxembourg and RC Aachen initially ended in a 21–0 win for Aachen but was later changed to a 50–0 victory for Luxembourg because RCA fielded two underaged players.
 The game between RC Luxembourg and ASV Köln Rugby was cancelled by both teams with both clubs being deducted two points.

South
The table and results of the division:

 Relegated: None
 Promoted: None

Second stage
In the second stage sixteen clubs played in two groups of eight clubs each.  Within each group each team played the others home and away except for the match-ups that already had been played in the first round. The results of those were carried over.  All teams in this stage qualified for the play-offs and were seeded according to the final standings.

North-East
The table and results of the division:

South-West
The table and results of the division:

 Heusenstamm's home game against Mainz was played in Mainz as Heusenstamm's home ground was unfit to be played on due to weather conditions.
 Both games between Heusenstamm and Heidelberger RK were played at Heusenstamm.
 TV Pforzheim deducted four points for insufficient number of youth teams.
 SC 1880 Frankfurt's home game against SC Neuenheim, originally ending 15–59, was awarded 50–0 to Frankfurt because Neuenheim fielded two ineligible players. This decision was later reversed and the original result restored.
 RG Heidelberg's home game against RC Mainz was not played as Mainz canceled because of a lack of players. Game awarded 50–0 to Heidelberg.

Play-off stage
In the play-offs the sixteen qualified clubs play a knock-out competition in single game format with the winner moving on to the next round. In the first round of the play-off the north-east division clubs play against the south-west division clubs. The play-offs began on 4 May with the round of sixteen, followed by the quarter finals on 25 May, semi finals on 1 June and the German championship final on 15 June 2013. However, both semi final games, to be held in Heidelberg, had to be postponed because of bad weather, and rescheduled for 12 June.

 The Berliner SV 92, Victoria Linden and USV Potsdam all cancelled their first round play-off games, citing a lack of players, with all three games awarded 50-0 to the opposition.

References

External links 
 rugbyweb.de - Rugby-Bundesliga table & results 
 Totalrugby.de - Bundesliga table & results 
 Rugby-Bundesliga at scoresway.com

2012–13
2012–13 in German rugby union
Germany
2012 in Luxembourgian sport
2013 in Luxembourgian sport